The 2011 Pacific Life Pacific-10 Conference men's basketball tournament was played on March 9–11, 2011 at Staples Center in Los Angeles, California. The tournament champion became the NCAA tournament automatic qualifier from the conference. The Arizona Wildcats, finish the season atop of the conference with a 14–4 record, and the UCLA Bruins were the two top-seed teams in the tournament. The third-seeded Washington Huskies won the tournament.  This was the final tournament ever held under the "Pac-10" name, as Colorado and Utah joined the conference in July, making it the "Pac-12."

Seeds
Teams were seeded by conference record, with a tiebreaker system used to seed teams with identical conference records.

Schedule

Bracket

Tournament notes
 Both men’s and women’s basketball tournament semi-final and final games were held at the Staples Center.
 The annual Coach of the Year Award was renamed to honor Coach John Wooden. Sean Miller of the Arizona Wildcats was the 2011 winner.
 Chick Hearn Court between Staples Center and LA Live was the location for the new Pac-10 FanFest, featuring a basketball sport court, beer garden, family-friendly activities like face painting and sign making, a live DJ, band and cheer performances, and Wolfgang Puck food specials. The Women's trophy presentation and institutional headquarters were also located at the FanFest.
 The championship game was the first title game in conference history to require an overtime period.
 Washington and Washington St. were the only arch rivals to meet up in this year. It was the first arch rival tournament game of any pair in two years.
 Klay Thompson of Washington State had a record setting 29 FG attempts vs. Washington. His record still stands. He was 15 of 29 . 
 Jeremy Green's 15 3-pt. FG attempts vs. Oregon State set a tournament record. Playing for Stanford, he was 7 of 15.
 With the automatic bid to the NCAA tournament, Washington made its 16th appearance. Three other teams were invited to the 2011 NCAA Men's Division I Basketball Championship: UCLA, USC, and Arizona.

All-Tournament Team

Jared Cunningham, Oregon State
E. J. Singler, Oregon
Klay Thompson, Washington State
Derrick Williams, Arizona
Terrence Ross, Washington
Isaiah Thomas, Washington

Most Outstanding Player
Isaiah Thomas, Washington

2011 Hall of Honor inductees

The induction ceremony took place on Saturday, March 12, 2011, during the Pac-10 Hall of Honor breakfast:

 Michael Dickerson (Arizona)
 Isaac Austin (Arizona State)
 Bob McKeen (California)
 Charlie Warren (Oregon)
 Charlie White (Oregon State)
 Brevin Knight (Stanford)
 Don MacLean (UCLA)
 Harold Miner (USC)
 Todd MacCulloch (Washington)
 Ray Sundquist (Washington State)

See also
2010–11 Pacific-10 Conference men's basketball standings

References

External links
 Pac-10 Basketball Tournament site

Pac-12 Conference men's basketball tournament
2010–11 Pacific-10 Conference men's basketball season